Hugh Ward may refer to:

 Aodh Buidhe Mac an Bhaird or Hugh Ward (c. 1593–1635), Irish Franciscan friar, poet, historian and hagiographer
 Hugh Jeffery Ward, American criminal who stole computer software
 Hugh Ward (bacteriologist) (1887–1972), Australian bacteriologist and Olympic rower
 Hugh J. Ward (1871–1941), American-born stage actor in Australia
 Hugh J. Ward (1909–1945), American illustrator
 Hugh Ward (footballer) (born 1970), Scottish footballer